Anıl is a Turkish masculine given name. Although it is often considered the same as the Indian 'Anil' name, these words come from different origins. In Turkish, the name means 'to be remembered'.  Notable persons with the name include:
 Anıl Dilaver (born 1990), Turkish footballer
 Anıl Karaer (born 1988), Turkish footballer
 Anıl Koç (born 1995), Turkish-Belgian footballer
 Anıl Taşdemir (born 1988), Turkish footballer
 Anıl Yüksel (born 1990), Dutch–born Turkish tennis player

See also 
 Anil (disambiguation)

Turkish unisex given names